Richard Edward Green (born Wolverhampton, 22 November 1967) is an English former professional footballer. He played for Shrewsbury Town, Swindon Town, Gillingham, Walsall, Rochdale and Northampton Town. In total he made 436 Football League appearances in a 16-year professional career, scoring 18 goals.

Honours
Walsall

 Football League Third Division (3rd tier) Runners-up: 1998–99

Northampton Town

 Football League Third Division (4th tier) 3rd place promotion: 1999–2000

Individual

 Gillingham Player of the Season: 1992–93, 1993–94

References

Living people
1967 births
Footballers from Wolverhampton
English footballers
Gillingham F.C. players
Walsall F.C. players
Rochdale A.F.C. players
Swindon Town F.C. players
Shrewsbury Town F.C. players
Northampton Town F.C. players
English Football League players
Association football defenders